The Putrajaya ePrix was an automobile race of the Formula E championship in Putrajaya, Malaysia, taking place in November. It was first raced in the 2014–15 season.

Circuit
The ePrix was held on the Putrajaya Street Circuit.

Results

References

 
Putrajaya
Auto races in Malaysia
Recurring sporting events established in 2014
2014 establishments in Malaysia